Juncus repens, the lesser creeping rush, is a species of flowering plant in the family Juncaceae. It is native to the southeastern United States, Cuba, and Tabasco in Mexico. When fully submerged it continues to grow, so it has found use as a freshwater aquarium plant.

References

repens
Aquarium plants
Flora of Oklahoma
Flora of Texas
Flora of the Southeastern United States
Flora of Tabasco
Flora of Cuba
Plants described in 1803